John Thomas Axton (July 28, 1870 – July 20, 1934) was a colonel in the United States Army who served as the first chief of chaplains from 1920 to 1928.

Early life and education 
John Thomas Axton was born in Salt Lake City, Utah, on July 28, 1870.  He attended Salt Lake public schools.  Then, he attended Middlebury College in Vermont where he graduated with a Doctor of Divinity in 1919.

Career 
Axton served as general secretary for the Y.M.C.A. from 1893 to 1902.

Axton was appointed a chaplain with the United States Army in 1902.

Awards 

Axton received the Army Distinguished Service Medal for his services during World War I.

Gallery

References

External links
 
 

United States Army colonels
United States Army personnel of World War I
Burials at Arlington National Cemetery
Recipients of the Distinguished Service Medal (US Army)
Military personnel from Salt Lake City
1870 births
1934 deaths
Chiefs of Chaplains of the United States Army
World War I chaplains
Middlebury College alumni
20th-century American clergy